Manrique Espinosa Navarro (born 17 August 2002), is a Bolivian footballer who plays as a defender for Club Destroyers.

Career statistics

Club

Notes

References

2002 births
Living people
Bolivian footballers
Association football defenders
Bolivian Primera División players
Club Destroyers players